Spec Property Developments is a major Australian Real estate development organization. The firm was founded in 1995, and has been involved in various notable development projects. Since 1997, the company has developed over $1 billion in residency projects.

References

Construction and civil engineering companies of Australia
Construction and civil engineering companies established in 1997
Australian companies established in 1997